Casey Becker is a fictional character from the Scream franchise, first appearing in the 1996 film Scream. The character was created by Kevin Williamson and originated by American actress Drew Barrymore. Casey was subsequently played by Heather Graham in Scream 2 for its movie-within-a-movie scenes. Casey and Steve Orth, her boyfriend, are the first characters to be killed in the franchise, in what has been called "one of the most famous scenes of all time."

Appearances
Casey Becker first appears in Scream for the first 12 minutes of the film. In 1997's Scream 2, the second installment the Scream franchise, the character appears in a film-within-a-film titled Stab. 

In October 2020, Barrymore unofficially revived the character for a short video skit titled What if Casey Becker from Scream Lived? on The Drew Barrymore Show in which she gets texts from the  killer on her cell phone, but ignores him.

Casting and development
Williamson created the character when he started the script. Initially, filmmakers did not think to cast a well-known actress for Casey's part, as the character dies in the opening of the film. Barrymore was initially cast as lead character Sidney Prescott in Scream (eventually played by Neve Campbell), but opted to take the role of Casey instead to break the trope of high-profile actresses never dying in horror films. Barrymore stated:

Casey's scenes were shot over five days as a bottle episode. At first, Dimension Films studio did not appreciate Casey being killed, and almost fired director Wes Craven over the scene.

In the Japanese dubbed version of the film, voice actress Megumi Hayashibara dubs Barrymore’s lines. In Scream 2, Casey is played by Heather Graham.

Fictional biography
Casey Becker is a 17-year-old Woodsboro teenager and the former girlfriend of Stu Macher. After receiving a taunting and threatening phone call, she is ordered to answer horror film trivia questions to save the life of her 18-year-old boyfriend, football player Steve Orth (portrayed by actor Kevin Patrick Walls). When Casey answers incorrectly, Steve is disemboweled on her porch and she is asked another question to save her own life. When she refuses to answer, Ghostface chases her down and kills her, leaving her disemboweled and hanged from a tree, where she is discovered by her father Mr. Becker.

Reception
Since Barrymore was featured so heavily in promotional materials, the character being killed off was a "huge shocker that let the audience know that Scream was a film where all bets were off." WhatCulture stated Casey was "the tone-setter for Scream and for the larger Scream franchise."

In his 2017 book Scream, author Steven West dissects the character, the way she acts in the film, and her appearance, writing "Drew Barrymore's previously exploited sex appeal... is deemphasized [with an] unbecoming bob wig..."

Writing for Comic Book Resources in January 2022, Renaldo Matadeen stated Casey was "Screams most iconic victim". Collider'''s Robert Brian Taylor called the appearance of Casey and her killing as "the defining point of the franchise." The Nerd Stash named Casey's killing as their number one "best kill" of the series. Polygon ranked Casey as number 5 on their top 40 Scream characters list, behind Dewey Riley (4), Randy Meeks (3), Sidney Prescott (2), and Gale Weathers (1). As the Polygon list was released in 2019, it does not include characters from 2022's Scream film.

Accolades for performances
Barrymore's performance as Casey earned her a nomination for Best Supporting Actress at the 1996 23rd Saturn Awards. She lost the award to Alice Krige who played the Borg Queen in Star Trek: First Contact.

While Graham's part in Scream 2 was a bit part, her performance received positive reviews. E! News considered her one of the best Scream franchise cameos, and Digital Spy called it a "prominent cameo". Giant Freakin Robot called Graham's performance one of her "memorable bit roles". The Guardian stated she "...upped her teen-cool stakes [with the] wink-wink role" and that "her talent outshone her co-stars." Parade'' stated along with Tori Spelling (who played Sidney Prescott) and Luke Wilson (who played Billy Loomis), Graham was "wickedly deadpan" in her performance.

References

Characters created by Wes Craven
Female characters in film
Female horror film characters
Fictional characters from California
Fictional murdered people
Film characters introduced in 1996
Scream (film series)
Scream (franchise) characters
Teenage characters in film